Marin is a bicycle manufacturer in Marin County, California, established in 1986.  It specializes in mountain bikes but also has other types.  Many of its 68 bicycles are named after locations in and around Marin County.

Bicycle range
Marin offers mountain bikes (full suspension & hardtail), road, street/urban, comfort and specific designs for women & children generally placed in the mid-high end bracket of each respective market.

Since the late 1990s Marin has manufactured full suspension mountain bikes.  Working with Jon Whyte, a British engineer who worked with Benetton Formula One racing cars in gearbox design, Marin developed a single-pivot rear suspension. Subsequent innovations including the TARA (Travel And Ride Adjustable) and quad link suspensions have lost the purity of the original concept but have maintained their popularity.

In February 2012, Marin Bikes agreed to be sold to a European Investment firm.

Timeline
 1986 Marin founded by Bob Buckley, whose first order of business was to hire Marin County notable (and Mountain Bike hall-of-famer) Joe Murray to help with product design. Marin’s first product was the Madrone Trail, a $199 mountain bike.
 1996 Marin is the first company to win a XC National Championship aboard a full suspension bike with Paul Lasenby winning the UK national title.
 2003 Bob stepped back in as acting president after a three-year hiatus with the desire to refocus the brand’s product offerings. Marin’s first Quad Link suspension bike is launched.
 2004 Marin Bikes moved to the old Grateful Dead building in Novato, taking over its 32,000sq ft office and warehouse space. The actual Dead recording studio remains operational until late 2007, with surviving band members and other area musicians rolling though the facilities.
 2008 construction of a second building was completed with addition of a 1,600sq ft office dedicated to product and design.
 2012, at age 66 Buckley sold Marin Bikes to a private holding group. The business remained headquartered in Marin County and operated as an independent group, managed by Tom Herington, Marin’s former CEO/CIO. Herington had worked with Buckley and Marin Bikes for 25 years as a contract consultant before being appointed CEO in 2011.
 July 2012, Matt VanEnkevort joined the company as CEO. Herington moved to the COO role. VanEnkevort had worked at Full Speed Ahead, Inc. in Washington State.

References

External links
Company homepage

Cycle manufacturers of the United States
Vehicle manufacturing companies established in 1986
Mountain bike manufacturers
Companies based in Marin County, California
1986 establishments in California